Luis María Balanzat de Orvay y Briones (1775–1843) was a Spanish military man, engineer and writer.

References

Spanish male writers
People of the Peninsular War
Spanish military engineers
History of the Balearic Islands
People from Ibiza
1775 births
1843 deaths